Ajit Kumar Basu (1912–1986) was an Indian cardiac surgeon. He was a recipient of Shanti Swarup Bhatnagar Prize, the highest Indian science award in 1967. He was honoured by the Government of India in 1970 with the Padma Shri, the fourth highest Indian civilian award. He qualified for his FRCS in 1946. He was the first Indian to be appointed examiner of the Royal College and served as its Hunterian Professor.

References

Indian cardiac surgeons
Recipients of the Shanti Swarup Bhatnagar Award in Medical Science
Recipients of the Padma Shri in medicine
1912 births
1986 deaths
20th-century Indian medical doctors
20th-century surgeons
Medical doctors from Kolkata